Rhaebo caeruleostictus is a species of toad in the family Bufonidae. It is endemic to Ecuador and occurs along the lower western slope of the Cordillera Occidental at elevations of  asl. The specific name caeruleostictus, from Latin caeruleus (=blue) and Greek stiktos (spotted), refers to the bluish colour pattern of this species. Accordingly, common name blue-spotted toad has been coined for it.

Description
Males measure  and females  in snout–vent length. The Dorsum and sides have blueish-blackish vermiculations on orangish background (this coloration is assumed to be aposematic). The tympanum is not visible. The parotoid glands are large.

Habitat and conservation
Its natural habitats are tropical moist forests and cloud forests. It is a terrestrial species that breeds in riparian habitats.

It is a rare species that is threatened by habitat loss caused by agricultural expansion, logging, and wood plantations. It has not been seen since 1997, and it might be extinct.

References

caeruleostictus
Amphibians of the Andes
Amphibians of Ecuador
Endemic fauna of Ecuador
Taxonomy articles created by Polbot
Amphibians described in 1859
Taxa named by Albert Günther